Bargarh Lok Sabha constituency is one of the 21 Lok Sabha parliamentary constituencies in Odisha state in eastern India. This constituency came into existence in 2008 as a part of the implementation of delimitation of parliamentary constituencies based on the recommendations of the Delimitation Commission of India in 2002. Before 2008, some of the constituencies were in Deogarh.

Assembly segments
Presently, Bargarh Lok Sabha constituency comprises 7 legislative assembly segments, which are:

Padampur, Bijepur, Bargarh and Bhatli legislative assembly segments were earlier in erstwhile Sambalpur constituency.

Members of Parliament

Election results

2019 election results

General elections 2014
In 2014 election, Biju Janata Dal candidate Dr.Pravas Kumar Singh defeated Bharatiya Janata Party candidate Subash Chouhan by a margin of 11,178 votes.

General Election 2009

See also
 Bargarh district
 List of Constituencies of the Lok Sabha

Notes

External links
Bargarh lok sabha  constituency election 2019 date and schedule

 

Lok Sabha constituencies in Odisha
Bargarh district
Jharsuguda district